The Grand Mesa is a large mesa in western Colorado in the United States. It is the largest flat-topped mountain in the world. The north side of the mesa is drained largely by Plateau Creek, a smaller tributary of the Colorado. The west side is drained largely by Kannah Creek, which is received to the west by the lower Gunnison River. Much of the mesa is within Grand Mesa National Forest. Over 300 lakes, including many reservoirs created and used for drinking and irrigation water, are scattered along the top of the formation. The Grand Mesa is flat in some areas, but quite rugged in others.

Geology
The mesa is topped by a hard layer of volcanic basalt. This layer formed between about 10.9 and 9.6 million years ago, by the eruption of at least 27 separate lava flows from a vent in the Crag Crest area and probably other vents. The resistant basalt layer suppressed erosion compared to the surrounding sedimentary rock layers, which suffered rapid downcutting from the action of the Colorado and the Gunnison rivers. The top layer rests on a thick sequence of Eocene shale and sandstone known as the Green River and Wasatch Formations. These layers in turn rest on a Cretaceous layer known as the Mesaverde Group that forms a cliff about halfway up the side of the mesa. The lowest layers are yellow and gray Mancos Shale of late Cretaceous age. The shale continues outward into the surrounding valleys in the vicinity of the mesa, providing a soil base that is fertile for various kinds of agriculture, especially in the Gunnison Valley to the south.

Climate
Climate on Grand Mesa varies by elevation. Higher elevations tend to be cooler and receive more precipitation. The top of the mesa is more than two miles above sea level, and experiences an alpine climate with substantial amounts of precipitation throughout the year. Because of the high altitude, summer days are mild, and temperatures drop sharply after sunset. Winter temperatures rarely rise above freezing, and can be extremely cold, often falling far below zero, especially at night. The top of the mesa is usually snow-free from late June through early October; however, the mesa receives heavy snowfall in the winter, rendering the forest service roads impassable. Accumulations of more than 300 inches of snow in the winter are typical. Surrounding areas with lower elevation are warmer and more arid throughout the year.

The following climate data is for Mesa Lakes Resort, located on the north slopes of the mesa at 9,800 feet above sea level, which experiences a subalpine climate (Köppen Dfc).

Geography
The mesa is traversed by the Grand Mesa Scenic and Historic Byway, which includes  SH 65, between the town of Mesa on the north and the town of Cedaredge on the south. The route over the mesa provides a dramatic contrast in landscape, climate and vegetation.  On the north side, the road climbs the steep terrain near the Powderhorn Resort ski area. The forested top of the mesa remains snowbound much later in the spring than the surrounding valleys, and is a popular location for cross-country skiing and snowmobiling.

See also

Mountain ranges of Colorado
Table (landform)
2014 West Salt Creek landslide

References

Further reading

External links

 

 

Colorado Plateau
Geology of the Rocky Mountains
Mesas of Colorado
Rocky Mountains
Landforms of Delta County, Colorado
Landforms of Mesa County, Colorado
Grand Mesa National Forest